Foundations of Funk – A Brand New Bag: 1964–1969 is the second of several James Brown era overviews released by Polydor Records in the mid-1990s. Expanding on the 1984 LP compilation Ain’t That a Groove - The James Brown Story 1966–1969 it covers 1964 to 1969.

Track listing
Disc 1
"Out of Sight" - 2:22
"Papa's Got a Brand New Bag, Pts. 1 & 2" - 4:16
"I Got You (I Feel Good)" - 2:45 	
"Money Won't Change You, Pts. 1 & 2" - 4:15 	
"Introduction/Out of Sight/Bring It Up" (Live) - 5:54
previously unreleased live version. Later released on 2009's Live at the Garden (Expanded Edition).	
"Let Yourself Go" - 3:57 	
"There Was a Time" - 4:25 	
"Cold Sweat, Pts. 1 & 2" - 7:23
"Get It Together, Pts. 1 & 2" - 8:57 	
"Goodbye My Love, Pts. 1 & 2" - 5:36 	
"I Can't Stand Myself (When You Touch Me), Pts. 1 & 2" - 7:19
"I Got The Feelin'" - 3:05
previously unreleased extended version
"The Popcorn" - 4:30
previously unreleased complete version	
"Cold Sweat" (false start and studio dialogue) - 0:23
previously unreleased false start
"Cold Sweat" (Alternate Take) - 6:50
previously unreleased alternate take

Disc 2
"Licking Stick—Licking Stick" (Live) - 4:15 
previously unreleased live version. Later released on 1998's Say It Live and Loud: Live in Dallas 08.26.68.
"Say It Loud—I'm Black And I'm Proud, Pts. 1 & 2" - 4:50 	
"Give It Up Or Turnit a Loose" - 4:30 	
"You Got To Have a Mother for Me" - 5:39
previously unreleased original mix
"I Don't Want Nobody To Give Me Nothing (Open Up The Door I'll Get It Myself)" - 9:43
previously unreleased complete version	
"Let a Man Come In and Do The Popcorn, Pts. 1 & 2" - 7:47
"It's a New Day, Pts. 1 & 2" - 6:25 	
"Ain't It Funky Now" - 9:28 	
"Brother Rapp" - 7:00
previously unreleased original mix
"Funky Drummer, Pts. 1 & 2" - 5:34 	
"She's The One" - 2:59 	
"Mother Popcorn" (Live) - 9:02
previously unreleased undubbed complete version

Personnel

Musicians

Production

References

James Brown compilation albums
Polydor Records compilation albums